Musamman Burj also known as the Saman Burj or the Shah-burj, is an octagonal tower standing close to the Shah Jahan's private hall Diwan-e-Khas in Agra Fort.

History
Musamman Burj was built by Shah Jahan for his beloved wife Mumtaz Mahal. It is said that at first a small marble palace built by Akbar was situated at this site, which was later demolished by Jehangir to erect new buildings. Shah Jahan in his turn chose this site to erect the multi-storied marble tower inlaid with precious stones for Mumtaz Mahal. It was built between 1631–40 and offers exotic views of the famous Taj Mahal.

Architecture
The Musamman Burj is made of delicate marble lattices with ornamental niches so that the ladies of the court could gaze out unseen. The decoration of the walls is pietra dura. The chamber has a marble dome on top and is surrounded by a verandah with a beautiful carved fountain in the center.

The tower looks out over the River Yamuna and is traditionally considered to have one of the most poignant views of the Taj Mahal. It is here that Shah Jahan along with his favorite daughter Jahanara Begum had spent his last few years as a captive of his son Aurangzeb. He lay here on his death bed while gazing at the Taj Mahal in Agra.

Gallery

See also
Shah Jahani Mahal
Moti Masjid

References

Agra Fort
Buildings and structures completed in 1640
Towers in India
1640 establishments in India